ʿAbd al-Raḥmān ibn Abu Bakr (–675), was an Arab Muslim military commander in the service of the Islamic prophet Muhammad, and the Rashidun caliphs Abu Bakr, and Umar. His mother was Umm Ruman and he was the full brother of Aisha.  

Unlike the rest of his family, including his father Abu Bakr and sister Aisha, he did not convert to Islam until the Treaty of Hudaybiyah in 628.

Four generations of the family of Abd al-Rahman had the distinction of being the companions (sahaba) of the Islamic prophet Muhammad namely Abd al-Rahman, his father Abu Bakr As-Siddiq, his grandfather Uthman Abu Quhafa and his son Abu Atiq Muhammad. It was believed that no other family held this distinction.

Biography 
While still a non-Muslim, Abd al-Rahman fought on the side of Quraish in the Battles of Badr and Uhud.

In the Battle of Badr, he had an opportunity to kill his father, Abu Bakr, but he turned in another direction. Years later, after becoming a Muslim, he told his father about it. Thereupon Abu Bakr replied: "If I had had such an opportunity, I would not have spared you."

In the Battle of Uhud before the fighting began, he came forward and threw down a challenge for a duel. Abu Bakr accepted the challenge, but Muhammad stopped him, saying, "Sheathe your sword, and let us continue to profit by your wise counsels."

After becoming a Muslim, Abd al-Rahman participated in all the battles fought by the Muslims and gained fame as a fierce warrior, especially in the Muslim conquest of Syria. He was one of the Mubarizun champions and fought duels in the battles for the Muslim army. The mubarizun unit of the Rashidun army was composed of elite warriors who were champion swordsmen, lancers and archers. In the battlefield his role was to undermine the morale of the enemy before the beginning of the battle by slaying their champions in duels.

In the Battle of Yamama he killed Muhakkam al-Yamama, the general commanding the forces of Musaylima.

In the Battle of Yarmouk, the commander in chief of the Byzantine force chose five selected warriors from the Byzantine side, and they challenged the Muslims to duels. It was Abd al-Rahman who accepted the challenge. Scores of duels were fought on the plains of Yarmouk. Abd al-Rahman killed all of them one after the other.

At the Battle of Busra in Syria, he entered the city of Busra through a subterranean passage and then dashing towards the city gates opened them for the main Muslim army to enter.

Later, Abd al-Rahman was mentioned again as being involved in the Muslim campaign to Bahnasa. The Byzantine Sudanese forces fled to Bahnasa town and locked the gates. They were followed by the Muslims who besieged the town, while the enemy were reinforced by the arrival of 50,000 troops according to the report of al-Maqqari. The siege dragged on for months, until Khalid ibn al-Walid commanded Zubayr ibn al-Awwam, Dhiraar ibn al-Azwar and other commanders to intensify the siege.  He assigned the commanders to lead around 10,000 Companions of the Prophet, with 70 among them being veterans of the Battle of Badr. Abd al-Rahman was mentioned as one of the Rashidun commanders. The Byzantines and their Copt allies showering the Rashidun army with arrows and stones, until the Rashidun overcame the defenders, as Dhiraar, the first emerge, came out from the battle with his entire body stained in blood, while confessing to personally slaying about 160 Byzantine soldiers during the battle. The Muslim army managed to breach the gate and storming the city forced the surrender of the inhabitants.  According to the chronicles, the siege of Bahnasa were so fierce that in this battle alone, 5,000 Companions of the prophet (Sahabah) perished during this battle, as the thousands of their tombs could still to be seen in the modern day.

Later, the Muslim forces besieged Barqa (Cyrenaica) for about three years to no avail. Then Khalid ibn al-Walid, who had previously participated in the conquest of Oxyrhynchus, offered a radical plan to erect a catapult that would be filled with sacks of cotton. Then as the night came and the city guard slept, Khalid ordered his best warriors including Abd al-Rahman ibn Abi Bakr, Zubayr ibn al-Awwam, his son Abd Allah, Fadl ibn Abbas, Abu Mas'ud al-Badri, and Abd al-Razzaq to step into the catapult platform which was then filled with cotton sacks. The catapult launched them one by one to the top of the wall and allowed these warriors to climb the top of the city walls, open the gates and kill the guards, thus allowing the Muslim forces to enter and capture the city.

After his death, Abd al-Rahman ibn Abi Bakr was buried in Mecca. .

See also
Companions of the Prophet
Abu Bakr
Siddiqui
Bodla
Sheekhaal
Qallu
Muhammad ibn Abi Bakr
Abd Allah ibn Abi Bakr
Aisha
Asma bint Abi Bakr
Umm Kulthum bint Abi Bakr
Qasim ibn Muhammad ibn Abi Bakr

Appendix

Notes

References

Sources 
 
 
 

675 deaths
Abu Bakr family
Place of birth unknown
Place of death unknown
Year of birth unknown
Companions of the Prophet
Children of Rashidun caliphs